Felix Pachlatko (born 1950 in Zürich) is a Swiss organist.

Career 
Pachlatko studied in Basel with Eduard Müller. After his soloist diploma, he completed his education with Anton Heiller and Jean-Claude Zehnder. He held this position until December 2013. Pachlatko taught as a lecturer at the City of Basel Music Academy.

References

External links 
 Felix Pachlatko on France Orgue

1950 births
Living people
Musicians from Zürich
Classical organists
Swiss music educators
21st-century organists